is a passenger railway station located in the town of Tajiri, Sen'nan District. Osaka Prefecture, Japan, operated by the private railway operator Nankai Electric Railway. It has the station number "NK34".

Lines

Layout
The station consists of two opposed side platforms connected by a level crossing. The station is unattended.

Platforms

Adjacent stations

History
Yoshiminosato Station opened on 1 October 1915.

Passenger statistics
In fiscal 2019, the station was used by an average of 3912 passengers daily.

Surrounding area
 Tajiri Town Hall
Tajiri Municipal Elementary School
 Tajiri Municipal Junior High School
Tajiri History Museum

See also
 List of railway stations in Japan

References

External links

  

Railway stations in Japan opened in 1915
Railway stations in Osaka Prefecture
Tajiri, Osaka